No. 9 Flying Training School (9 FTS) is a former Royal Air Force flying training school that operated between 1936 and 1955.

References

Citations

Bibliography

External links

09
Military units and formations established in 1936
Military units and formations disestablished in 1955